"The War Is On" is a song by Japanese rock band Coldrain. It is the second single for their third studio album The Revelation, produced by David Bendeth, written by Masato Hayakawa and Ryo Yokochi, and was released on 25 July 2013.

At the time of the song's release, this was frontman, Masato Hayakawa's favourite song from the record and the band, in which he states that he didn't think the song wouldn't have translated into a live setting as well as it did.

Background
"The War Is On" was released on 25 July 2013 as the band's second single and the opening track off their sixth studio album The Revelation, following the release of the first and lead single "The Revelation" which was released three months prior in April of the same  year. It was the first single to be released after the album's Japanese release.

Promotion and release
Upon signing an international deal for the first time with Hopeless Records, becoming the first Japanese band to sign with the North American independent label in the process. The band would go on to announce the re-release of their 2013 album The Revelation. Alongside the announcement, they would re-release the single for "The War Is On" on 13 May 2014. The single would end up getting substantial airplay on BBC Radio 1 and Kerrang! in the UK.

Composition
"The War Is On" has been described as a post-hardcore, metalcore, alternative metal, alternative rock and a hard rock song. The track runs at 160 BPM and is in the key of D minor. It runs for three minutes and 33 seconds. The song was written by Masato Hayakawa and Ryo Yokochi, it was produced by David Bendeth who also handled the production for the rest of the album.

Track listing

Music video
The music video for "The War Is On" was released alongside the single on 25 July 2013 on the Gilsoundworks YouTube channel. Among the re-release, the music video would also be published to the Hopeless Records YouTube channel on 13 May 2014. The video was directed by Inni Vision.

The video starts with frontman, Masato Hayakawa, who takes off a creepy looking mask to start the song with the band. The video is set in a large office building in Tokyo where all the workers wear a creepy mask, which are akin to that of which is worn by Michael Myers in the Halloween films. As the song progresses, the band members are individually surrounded by a whole room worth of workers wearing these masks around a circular table which surrounds the band members one by one, as if they are about to be interrogated. As the song culminates, the band defies the group of cult-like workers by jamming the rest of the song in the room as it turns to darkness.

As of January 2022, the song between the two videos has a total of 2.1 million views on YouTube.

Personnel
Credits adapted from Tidal.

Coldrain

 Masato Hayakawa – lead vocals, lyricist, programming
 Ryo Yokochi – lead guitar, programming, composition
 Kazuya Sugiyama – rhythm guitar, programming
 Ryo Shimizu – bass guitar
 Katsuma Minatani – drums, percussion

Additional personnel

 David Bendeth – producer, mixing, arrangement
 Ted Jensen – mastering
 Brian Robbins – audio engineer, mixing engineer, editing 
 Michael Milan – electronic programming, engineer, editing 
 John Bender – engineer, vocals, vocal arrangements
 Dan Graziano – editing
 Mike Lisa – editing

Release history

References

Coldrain songs
2013 songs
2013 singles
2014 singles
Hopeless Records singles
Sony Music singles
Song recordings produced by David Bendeth
Songs written by Masato Hayakawa
Japanese hard rock songs